Attif Soudi (born 18 June 1948) is an Egyptian sports shooter. He competed in the men's 50 metre rifle, prone event at the 1984 Summer Olympics.

References

1948 births
Living people
Egyptian male sport shooters
Olympic shooters of Egypt
Shooters at the 1984 Summer Olympics
Place of birth missing (living people)